The Nightingale sixth rates were basically repeats of the Maidstone Group. Initially two vessels were ordered, however with one lost within months of completion a third vessel was ordered. The main difference between these and the Maidstones was the slight deck over the upper deck to improve defensibility. Their armament was similar as were the dimensions of the vessels. They were constructed between 1702 and 1704.

Design and specifications
The construction of the vessels was assigned to naval dockyards. As with most vessels of this time period only order and launch dates are available. Each ship was built to the Maidstone Group generalized specification with dimensional creep accruing in all vessels. The dimensional data listed here is the general specification, whereas the actual dimensions where known will be listed with each ship. The tonnage calculation would be .

The gun armament as established in 1703 would be twenty 6-pounder cannon mounted on wooden trucks on the upper deck with four 3-pounder guns on the quarterdeck.

Ships of the Nightingale Group

Notes

Citations

References
 Colledge, Ships of the Royal Navy, by J.J. Colledge, revised and updated by Lt Cdr Ben Warlow and Steve Bush, published by Seaforth Publishing, Barnsley, Great Britain, © 2020, e  (EPUB)
 Winfield, British Warships in the Age of Sail (1603 – 1714), by Rif Winfield, published by Seaforth Publishing, England © 2009, EPUB , Chapter 6, The Sixth Rates, Vessels acquired from 18 December 1688, Sixth Rates of 20 guns and up to 26 guns, Nightingale Group

 

Corvettes of the Royal Navy
Naval ships of the United Kingdom